The London Fever Hospital was a voluntary hospital financed from public donations in Liverpool Road in London. It was one of the first fever hospitals in the country.

History

Originally established with 15 beds in 1802 in Gray's Inn Road, it moved in 1815 to the west wing of the Smallpox Hospital at Battle Bridge where it had 120 beds.

After the Northern Railway bought the original site for King's Cross station the compensation money paid enabled the charity to commission a new Hospital on Kettle Field, a 4-acre site in Liverpool Road, Islington with 200 beds. The new hospital, which was designed by Charles Fowler, opened in 1848. By 1924 it had about 150 beds. A new wing was opened by the Duchess of York in 1928 and a new isolation block was opened by the Duke of Kent in 1938.

In 1948, the hospital joined the National Health Service under the same management as the Royal Free Hospital. After services had been transferred to the Royal Free Hospital, the hospital closed in 1975.

See also
Grove Fever Hospital

References

Further reading
The London Fever Hospital. Lancet, 1848, ii, p 483
The London Encyclopaedia; Ben Weinreb, Christopher Hibbert. Macmillan 1995. , p 476, 692

External links
NHS History: Fever Hospitals

1802 establishments in England
Defunct hospitals in London
History of the London Borough of Camden
History of the London Borough of Islington
Voluntary hospitals
Fever hospitals